Mackenzie River is a former territorial electoral district, that elected Members to the Northwest Territories Legislative Assembly.

1954 election

References

Former electoral districts of Northwest Territories